Mercedes is a district of the Heredia canton, in the Heredia province of Costa Rica.

Geography 
Mercedes has an area of  km² and an elevation of  metres.

Demographics 

For the 2011 census, Mercedes had a population of  inhabitants.

Transportation

Road transportation 
The district is covered by the following road routes:
 National Route 3
 National Route 111
 National Route 126

Economy
The main industries in the city are textiles and food.

Rail transportation 
The Interurbano Line operated by Incofer goes through this district.

References 

Districts of Heredia Province
Populated places in Heredia Province